National Sojourners is an American patriotic organization of Freemasons who have served in the United States Armed Forces. Members are organized and meet in Chapters.

Purpose
The stated purpose of the organization is "to organize active duty and veterans of the uniformed forces (...) of the United States (...) who are Master Masons (...) for the promotion of good fellowship among its members, (...) for developing true Patriotism and Americanism throughout the Nation (...)"

The organization pursues its aims by assisting local Masonic authorities through initiatives which promote American patriotism and Americanism, both with the fraternity and the community. These include: Youth Leadership Programs, essay contests, educational programs and involvement in ROTC and JROTC awards.

History
The organization developed from a group of American Freemasons in the Philippines who participated from 1898 in meetings of a field lodge attached to the North Dakota Regiment of Volunteer Infantry, which met under a dispensation granted by the Grand Lodge of North Dakota. When the regiment withdrew from the Philippines in 1900, the American Freemasons left behind formed an informal Sojourners Club.

In 1917, a group of Masonic military officers, meeting in Chicago, Illinois, formally organized the Chicago Sojourners Club. Further Sojourners' clubs formed at army posts and naval bases around the United States and overseas. In 1927, the word Club was officially dropped and the National Sojourners were formally incorporated in 1931. Today, National Sojourners are organized in some 160 chapters in 46 states of the United States as well as in Germany and France.

The organization's headquarters are in Springfield, Virginia. It also houses the Museum on Americanism. Both are open to the public.

Notable members
 Rear Admiral Richard E. Byrd, USN (1888–1957), member of National Sojourners Chapter No. 3 at Washington
 Major General Ronald Markarian, USAF (1931-2019), former National President of National Sojourners
 General of the Armies Douglas MacArthur
President (Colonel)Harry S. Truman

References

External links
 Official Website

Masonic organizations
Freemasonry in the United States